Heping is a town of Yuzhong County, Lanzhou, Gansu, China. It is informally known as Lanzhou's college town, with several college and university campuses located in the town.

Educational institutes 

 Lanzhou University of Finance and Economics
 Lanzhou Vocational College of Foreign Languages
 Lanzhou University of Finance and Economics Longqiao College
 Lanzhou Jiaotong University Bowen College
 Lanzhou Chenggong School
 Hengshui No. 1 Middle School Lanzhou Branch

References 

Yuzhong County